Lorenzo Petrarca (born 24 July 1997 in Sant'Omero) is an Italian motorcycle racer. He competes in the CIV Supersport 600 Championship aboard a Kawasaki ZX-6R.

Career statistics

Grand Prix motorcycle racing

By season

Races by year

References

External links

1997 births
Living people
Italian motorcycle racers
Moto3 World Championship riders